James Conroy (born 28 April 1943) is an Irish archer. He competed at the 1976 Summer Olympics and the 1980 Summer Olympics.

References

1943 births
Living people
Irish male archers
Olympic archers of Ireland
Archers at the 1976 Summer Olympics
Archers at the 1980 Summer Olympics
Place of birth missing (living people)